The 2021 Transylvania Open was a women's tennis tournament played on indoor hard courts. It was the first edition of the Transylvania Open, and part of the WTA 250 series of the 2021 WTA Tour. It was held at the BT Arena in Cluj-Napoca, Romania, from 25 until 31 October, 2021.

Champions

Singles

  Anett Kontaveit def.  Simona Halep, 6–2, 6–3

This was Kontaveit's fifth career WTA singles title, and was her fourth of the year. By winning the title, Kontaveit qualified for the WTA Finals.

Doubles

  Irina Bara /  Ekaterine Gorgodze def.  Aleksandra Krunić /  Lesley Pattinama Kerkhove, 4–6, 6–1, [11–9].

This was the first WTA Tour level doubles title won by either Bara or Gorgodze.

Singles main draw entrants

Seeds

 Rankings are as of October 18, 2021.

Other entrants
The following players received wildcards into the main draw:
  Irina Bara
  Jaqueline Cristian
  Andreea Prisăcariu

The following players received entry using a protected ranking: 
  Mona Barthel
  Ivana Jorović

The following players received entry from the qualifying draw:
  Anna Bondár
  Anastasia Gasanova 
  Alexandra Ignatik 
  Aleksandra Krunić 
  Lesley Pattinama Kerkhove
  Lesia Tsurenko

The following player received entry as a lucky loser:
  Jana Fett

Withdrawals
Before the tournament
  Ekaterina Alexandrova → replaced by  Polona Hercog
  Paula Badosa → replaced by  Anna-Lena Friedsam
  Viktorija Golubic → replaced by  Alison Van Uytvanck
  Kaia Kanepi → replaced by  Ivana Jorović
  Veronika Kudermetova → replaced by  Bernarda Pera
  Elise Mertens → replaced by  Elena-Gabriela Ruse
  Camila Osorio → replaced by  Jana Fett
  Mayar Sherif → replaced by  Mona Barthel

Doubles main draw entrants

Seeds

 Rankings are as of October 18, 2021.

Other entrants
The following pairs received wildcards into the doubles main draw:
  Ilinca Amariei /  Briana Szabó 
  Alexandra Ignatik /  Andreea Prisăcariu

Withdrawals 
Before the tournament
  Sharon Fichman /  Giuliana Olmos → replaced by  Alena Fomina-Klotz /  Ekaterina Yashina
  Ulrikke Eikeri /  Catherine Harrison → replaced by  Anna Danilina /  Ulrikke Eikeri

References

External links
Official website
WTA official website

Transylvania Open
2021 in Romanian tennis
Transylvania Open